Merceline Dahl-Regis, CMG OD, is a Bahamian physician and public health expert. She is the former Chief Medical Officer of the Bahamas and has been recognized for her role in advancing public health in the Caribbean and internationally.

Biography 
Dahl-Regis earned her medical degree from the University of West Indies in the 1960s, becoming one of the first women to graduate in medicine in the Bahamas. She earned a degree in public health from Johns Hopkins University. She completed a residency in paediatrics at Howard University, where she subsequently accepted a faculty position.

Returning home to the Bahamas, Dahl-Regis obtained a position at Princess Margaret Hospital. She was appointed Chief Medical Officer of the Bahamas in 1997. In 2009, Dahl-Regis was awarded the Pan American Health Organization Award for Administration, for her contributions to health care management, research, and medical education. She was credited for her innovations to the public health system, including the introduction of non-medical administrators to public health clinics so that medical staff could focus on delivering health care. She was also recognized for her management of a malaria outbreak within the tourism industry.

In 2010, Dahl-Regis was appointed to chair an international expert committee responsible for verifying the elimination of measles, rubella and congenital rubella syndrome in the Americas. In 2016, the committee declared the Americas free of endemic measles, following a 22-year vaccination drive.

In 2018, Dahl-Regis was presented with the PAHO Public Health Hero of the Americas award. At the ceremony, Bahamian Prime Minister Hubert Minnis commended Dahl-Regis on her efforts to eliminate vaccine-preventable diseases. The same year, she was named an Officer of the Bahamian Order of Distinction.

In 2020, during the global COVID-19 pandemic, Dahl-Regis coordinated the Bahamian government's COVID-19 task force.

Selected works

References 

Living people
Bahamian physicians
Bahamian women
Caribbean women physicians
University of the West Indies alumni
Johns Hopkins Bloomberg School of Public Health alumni
Howard University faculty
Year of birth missing (living people)